The Shardak (Şarźaq) is a river in the Tatyshlinsky District of Bashkortostan, in Russia; it flows into the river Yug (Yoq, a tributary of the Bystry Tanyp). It flows past the villages Old Shardak and New Shardak (Yañı Şarźaq).

Etymology of the name Shardak 
Hydronym 'Shardak' has Finno-Ugric origin, now the term 'Shardak' is preserved in Bashkirs from Urman-Girey clan and means - 'fishing net'. The term and hydronym in the form of a “Shardz” is also preserved in the Ugro-Finnish languages themselves, for example, in Komi, Mari, Sámi, Finnish languages. So in the languages Komi-Ziryane and Komi-Permyak from Perm Krai, fishing tackle is called a Shardz. A number of rivers and lakes where Mari, Komi, Finns (Suomi), Sámi live are still called Shardi, Sharda.

If initially from Finno Ugric fishermen 'sharda' (шарда) meant 'fishing tackle', then among Finno Ugric hunters, moose began to be called  'shardi' (шарды).

Water registry data 
According to  State Water Register of Russia refers to Kama River, the water sector of the river is Belaya from the city Birsk and to the mouth, the river sub-basin of the river is Belaya. The river basin of the river is Kama

Geographical location 
Distance to:
 district center (Verkhniye Tatyshly): 12 km,
 center of the village council (Kaltyaevo): 7 km,
 the nearest railway station (Kueda): 37 km.

Notes

References

Tributaries of the Belaya (Kama)
Rivers of Bashkortostan